There are more than 10,000 tomato varieties available.


Table of tomatoes

See also
 Lists of cultivars
 List of tomato dishes

Notes

Some tomato cultivars will be marked with disease resistance codes, signifying that the plant is immune to a certain disease shown below:
A — Alternaria stem canker
F — Fusarium wilt
FF — Fusarium races 1 and 2
FFF — Fusarium races 1, 2 and 3
N — Nematodes
T — Tobacco mosaic virus
St — Stemphylium gray leaf spot
V — Verticillium wilt

References

External links 

 Non-profit discussion forums for tomato growers with special emphasis on heirloom varieties

Lists of cultivars

Tomatoes